Since its founding in 1851, The New York Times has endorsed a candidate for president of the United States in every election in the paper's history. The first endorsement was in 1852 for Winfield Scott and the most recent one was for Joe Biden in 2020. Its first seven endorsements after Scott were for Republicans, and it was not until 1884 that it backed its first Democrat, Grover Cleveland.  In total it has endorsed the Democratic candidate twenty eight times, the Republican thirteen times (the last being Dwight D. Eisenhower in 1956), a Whig candidate once (Winfield Scott in 1852), and a third-party candidate once (John M. Palmer in 1896).

Primary election

Democratic Party

Republican Party

General election

References

The New York Times
United States presidential election endorsements
Newspaper endorsements
Presidential elections in the United States